The 1978 San Jose Earthquakes season was the fifth for the franchise in the North American Soccer League.  They finished in fourth place in
the Western Division of the American Conference.

Squad
The 1978 squad

Competitions

NASL

Match results

Season 

* = ShootoutSource:

Standings

American Conference

References

External links
The Year in American Soccer – 1978 | NASL
San Jose Earthquakes Game Results | Soccerstats.us
San Jose Earthquakes Rosters | nasljerseys.com

San Jose Earthquakes seasons
San Jose Earthquakes
San Jose Earthquakes
1978 in sports in California